Engyophrys is a genus of small lefteye flounders native to the oceans around the Americas.

Species
There are currently two recognized species in this genus:
 Engyophrys sanctilaurentii D. S. Jordan & Bollman, 1890 (Speckled-tail flounder)
 Engyophrys senta Ginsburg, 1933 (American spiny flounder)

References

Bothidae
Marine fish genera
Taxa named by David Starr Jordan
Taxa named by Charles Harvey Bollman